The 2021–22 Senior Women's National Football Championship, also known as Hero Senior Women's National Football Championship for sponsorship reasons, was the 26th edition of the Senior Women's National Football Championship, the premier competition in India for women's teams representing regional and state football associations. The tournament was hosted in Kerala, between 28 November and 9 December 2021.

Manipur, the defending champions retained the title after beating Railways 2–1`in the penalty shootout in the final. Tamil Nadu's Sandhiya Ranganathan, with 12 goals, was the highest scorer of the tournament, while Manipur's goalkeeper Okram Roshini Devi won the best goalkeeper award.

Format
32 teams competed in the tournament and were split into eight groups of four teams each in the preliminary round.

Round dates

Group stage

Group A

Group B

Group C

Group D

Group E

Group F

Group G

Group H

Bracket

Quarter-finals

Semi-finals

Final

Awards

References

External links
 Senior Women's National Football Championship on the All India Football Federation website

Senior Women's National Football Championship
2021–22 in Indian football
Sport in Kerala